Motion sickness (or car sickness) is a condition in which a disagreement exists between visually perceived movement and the vestibular system's sense of movement. 

Car Sick may also refer to:

"Car Sick", song by Gunna from Drip Season 3
"Car Sick", song by Rustic Overtones